Sabatino de Ursis (1575–1620, Chinese name: 熊三拔; pinyin: Xióng Sānbá) was an Italian Jesuit who was active in 17th-century China, during the Jesuit China missions.

Career
Born in Lecce, Apulia, Sabatino de Ursis arrived in 1607 in Beijing, in order to help Matteo Ricci with astronomical research. He also worked together with Xú Guāngqĭ and Matteo Ricci on the translation of Euclid's Elements into Chinese, and with Ricci on the Zhifang waiji, China's first global atlas.

Sabatino de Ursis also wrote a book in Chinese on Western hydraulics, an example of the transmission of Western technical knowledge to China in the 17th century.

De Ursis is famous for having predicted an eclipse, which had not been foretold by traditional Chinese astronomers, on December 15, 1610. This was very important to the Chinese, and was a strong argument to let the Western Jesuits work on the reformation of the Chinese calendar. Soon, however, de Ursis and colleague Diego de Pantoja had to abandon the project in the face of opposition by Chinese astronomers.

In 1612, Sabatino translated orally a work by Agostino Ramelli on hydraulic mechanisms, which was put into Chinese by Xú Guāngqĭ. The book was published under the name 泰西水法 (Tàixī shuǐfǎ, Hydraulic machinery of the West).

In 1616, dislike of the Jesuits led to a persecution of Christians at the instigation of Shen Ho (Shěn Hè, 沈隺, vice minister of rites in Nanking, d. 1624), and de Ursis was expelled to Macau, where he died in 1620:

At the renewed suggestion of Xu Guangqi, an Imperial edict of 1629 would again put the Jesuits in charge of the revision of the calendar, which would be handled by the German Jesuit Johann Schall.

Publications
 Sabatino de Ursis and Xu Guangqi (1612) 泰西水法 (Thai Hsi Shui Fa, Hydraulic machinery of the West)

Notes

References
 Udías, Agustín (2003) Searching the Heavens and the Earth: The History of Jesuit observatories, Kluwer Academic Publisher,  
 Catherine Jami, Peter Engelfriet, Gregory Blue (2001) Statecraft and Intellectual Renewal in Late Ming China. The cross-cultural synthesis of Xu Guangqi (1562–1633), p. 209, BRILL,

Further reading
 John W. O'Malley, Gauvin Alexander Bailey, Steve J. Harris, T. Frank Kennedy (1999) The Jesuits: Cultures, Sciences, and the Arts (1540–1773), University of Toronto Press

External links
The Jesuits in China

1575 births
1620 deaths
17th-century Italian Jesuits
Jesuit missionaries in China
Italian emigrants to China
17th-century Italian astronomers
Jesuit scientists